Kamloops — Shuswap was a federal electoral district in British Columbia, Canada, that was represented in the House of Commons of Canada from 1979 to 1988.

This riding was created in 1976 from parts of Fraser Valley East, Kamloops—Cariboo and Okanagan—Kootenay ridings.

It was abolished in 1987 when it was redistributed into Kamloops and Okanagan—Shuswap ridings.

It consisted of:
 the part of the Thompson-Nicola Regional District lying east of Electoral Areas E and I and north of Electoral Area M; and
 the part of the Columbia-Shuswap Regional District lying west of Electoral Area B.

Members of Parliament

Election results

See also
 List of Canadian federal electoral districts
 Past Canadian electoral districts

External links
 Riding history from the Library of Parliament

Former federal electoral districts of British Columbia